Bazm-e-Tariq Aziz (formerly Neelam Ghar and Tariq Aziz Show) was a quiz-format game show hosted by Tariq Aziz on PTV which started in 1975 and lasted for many years. It was renamed as Tariq Aziz Show in 1997 and in 2006 took the name Bazm E Tariq Aziz. The show celebrated its fortieth anniversary in October 2010. In February 2012, it celebrated its 300th episode.
It was the oldest television show in Pakistan.

With only a few interruptions, it had continuously run for the last 35 years on PTV and it had been hosted by Tariq Aziz since its first day.

Neelam Ghar was the first television show in Pakistan to have mass audience participation, commercial sponsorships for specific questions or question rounds, and extravagant prizes. Major corporations like Hitachi were prominent sponsors of the show.

Tariq Aziz had a unique speaking style. He belonged to Sahiwal but he lived in Lahore. "He is probably the most recognised PTV personality in Pakistan.” said former director of public relations and former press attaché to Bangladesh, Mohammed Hussain Malik. "His show in Bangladesh was a complete success. Bengalis who did not know any Urdu watched his show. He did four shows and all were completely sold out."

Aarif Rana was the creator and the first producer of Neelam Ghar. It was organised by Pakistan Television Corporation in Hall no. 2, Alhamra Arts Council, Lahore. Other Producers include Hafeez Tahir, Ayub Khawar, Syed Zahid Uzair, Farrukh Bashir, Agha Zulfiqar Farrukh, Agha Qaisar, Tajdar Aadil.
Karim Shahabuddin served for many years as the music director for the show in the 1980s.

See also 
 Inaam Ghar
 Inaam Ghar Plus
 Jeet Ka Dum
 Jeeto Pakistan

References

1970s Pakistani television series
1980s Pakistani television series
1990s Pakistani television series
2000s Pakistani television series
Pakistan Television Corporation original programming
Pakistani television talk shows
Quiz shows
Urdu-language television shows